Paul Vincent Dudley (November 29, 1926 – November 20, 2006) was an American prelate of the Catholic Church. He served as Bishop of Sioux Falls from 1978 to 1995.

Biography
Paul Dudley was born in Northfield, Minnesota, the tenth child of Edward Austin and Margaret Ann (née Nolan) Dudley. He studied at Nazareth Hall Preparatory Seminary and St. Paul Seminary in St. Paul before being ordained to the priesthood on June 2, 1951. He then served as a curate at Annunciation Church in Minneapolis until 1964, when he was transferred to St. Patrick Church in St. Paul. He became the founding pastor of St. Edward Church at Bloomington in 1967, and pastor of Our Lady of the Lake Church at Mound in 1972.

On November 9, 1976, Dudley was appointed Auxiliary Bishop of St. Paul and Minneapolis and Titular Bishop of Ursona by Pope Paul VI. He received his episcopal consecration on January 25, 1977, from Archbishop John Roach, with Archbishop Leo Binz and Bishop James Richard Ham, M.M., serving as co-consecrators, at the Basilica of St. Mary. In addition to his episcopal duties, he served as pastor of St. James Church at St. Paul from 1977 to 1978. Following the resignation of Bishop Lambert Anthony Hoch, Dudley was named the sixth Bishop of Sioux Falls, South Dakota, by Pope John Paul II on November 6, 1978. He was the first U.S. appointment of John Paul II, who had been elected that October. Dudley was later installed on December 13, 1978.

During his tenure, Dudley developed several ecumenical ministries serving the poor, and fostered many retreat and spiritual renewal programs. He was active in such anti-abortion organizations as  Minnesota Citizens Concerned for Life, Total Life Care, and Prolife Across America. He also served as episcopal moderator for Worldwide Marriage Encounter and for Teens Encounter Christ. He became a beloved figure among Catholics in the diocese, and was described as "a holy man" and "a true shepherd." After sixteen years as bishop, Dudley resigned on March 21, 1995. He retired to the family farm in Northfield, and there served as pastor of St. Dominic Church (1995-1997).

In 1999 Dudley was accused of sexually abusing two women in the 1960s and 1970s. However, the charges were later dropped due to insufficient evidence. In 2002 he was again accused of molesting an 11- or 12-year-old altar boy on four occasions during the 1950s. Following this accusation, he declared, "I totally deny these allegations. They are brutally unfounded." He also decided to withdraw from "any priestly ministry" pending the conclusion of an investigation "due to the great publicity given to priests and bishops accused of sexual abuse." An independent investigator hired by the St. Paul and Minneapolis Archdiocese later cleared the complaints against Dudley. He stated, "While living under the cloud of these accusations has been one of the greatest challenges of my life, I never lost faith and confidence that the truth would prevail."

Dudley was awarded the Distinguished Alumnus Award by St. Paul Seminary in 2006. He died later that year from lung disease at St. Joseph's Hospital in St. Paul, aged 79. He is buried at Calvary Cemetery in Northfield.

References

1926 births
2006 deaths
People from Northfield, Minnesota
University of St. Thomas (Minnesota) alumni
Roman Catholic Archdiocese of Saint Paul and Minneapolis
Roman Catholic bishops of Sioux Falls
20th-century Roman Catholic bishops in the United States
21st-century Roman Catholic bishops in the United States
Religious leaders from Minnesota
Catholics from Minnesota